The Tana Hydroelectric Power Station is a  hydroelectric power station on the Tana River in southern Kenya.

Location
The coordinates of the power station are:0°47'08.0"S, 37°15'55.0"E (Latitude:-0.785550; Longitude:37.265284).

Overview
The first power station on the site, drawing water from the Mathioya River was built in 1931. It was extended in 1955, drawing water from the Tana River, with capacity of 14.4MW, but generating only 10.4MW at time of decommissioning in 2007.

See also

List of power stations in Kenya

References

External links  
State plans two more hydro-electric power dams on Tana River
Kenya’s hydro-power sources drying up

Hydroelectric power stations in Kenya
Dams on the Tana River (Kenya)
Dams in Kenya
Murang'a County
Tana River (Kenya)
Dams completed in 2010
Energy infrastructure completed in 2010
2010 establishments in Kenya